The 112th Cavalry Regiment is a Texas National Guard regiment that served in several Pacific campaigns during World War II.

Early history
The 112th Cavalry was first organized in 1918 as the 5th Texas Cavalry Regiment before being disbanded in 1920. In December 1920 the Texas National Guard was reorganized as the 36th Infantry Division and the 1st Texas Cavalry Brigade less one regiment. On 20 July 1921 the 1st Texas Cavalry Regiment became the 112th Cavalry. In March 1929 the 2nd Squadron and the Machine Gun Squadron of the 112th were reorganized into the 124th Cavalry Regiment.  The 112th and 124th Cavalry were brigaded into the 56th Cavalry Brigade in 1940.

World War II
On 10 November 1940 President Roosevelt federalized the National Guard, and on 18 November 1940 the 112th was posted to Fort Bliss. The 112th's sister regiment in the brigade, the 124th Cavalry was the last of the cavalry regiments to give up their horses and was later sent to Burma.

The regiment patrolled the Mexican border until being shipped to New Caledonia on 8 July 1942 arriving on 11 August 1942. They were assigned to the Americal Division under General Alexander Patch.  
The 112th Cavalry were assigned Australian Waler horses, and ordered to New Caledonia to serve as a horse mounted security force. General Patch initially thought horse mounted cavalry could be used in jungle warfare, but the torrential Pacific rains and the mud that followed damaged the horses' hooves, changing the general's mind. The Australian horses were shipped to Burma and assigned to Chinese forces who mistreated them.  In 1944 the Walers rejoined the American Army being assigned to Merrill's Marauders.

During the heavy fighting on Guadalcanal, General Alexander Vandegrift of the 1st Marine Division sent an urgent request for machetes for his Marines.  General Patch took the sabers of the regiment, cut them down and sent them to the Marines for jungle warfare use.

After extensive training the 112th made its first amphibious landing at Woodlark Island as part of Operation Chronicle on 30 June 1943. The landing was unopposed, and the cavalrymen established a defensible perimeter to protect Seabees building an airstrip on the island.

The regiment was sent to Goodenough Island for training and became part of Task Force Director in preparation for its first action, Operation Director the Battle of Arawe. On 15 December 1943 the regiment landed in three separate amphibious operations on New Britain. 

One of these landings involved Troop A of the 2nd Squadron landing in rubber boats off Sands against fierce defense that sank all but three of the boats.  The destroyer  sailed close as possible to the enemy defenders to shell them and rescue the survivors of A Troop.

Troop B landed at Pilelo Island from Humphreys in 15 rubber boats on the same day.  When meeting resistance from Japanese troops in caves, Troop B destroyed one with a bazooka and one with a flamethrower the first use of the weapon in the Southwest Pacific area.

The main landings were from amphibious tractors launched from Carter Hall and landing craft from Westralia. In this landing the 112th Cavalry were the first to use the  rocket firing DUKWs.

After linking up with the 1st Marine Division, the 112th was assigned to the 32nd Infantry Division in Aitape Papua New Guinea. The regiment fought in the Battle of Driniumor River for 51 days taking 62% casualties. Two of the regiment's second lieutenants, Dale Eldon Christensen and George W. G. Boyce Jr. were awarded the Medal of Honor for their actions during this period.

On 1 October 1944 the 112th Cavalry was combined with the 114th Field Artillery Battalion became the 112th Regimental Combat Team (RCT) and departed Aitape for Leyte in the Philippines on 31 October 1944.  The 112th RCT was attached to the 1st Cavalry Division for the Battle of Leyte and Battle of Luzon.

Following the Japanese surrender, the 112th landed in Japan for Occupation Duties on 3 September 1945.

During World War II the 112th Cavalry served 434 days in combat.  They were the first U.S. Army unit in the Southwest Pacific to use bazookas and flame throwers against enemy defenses and first used rocket firing DUKWs in amphibious assaults.  The 112th were the first unit in the Philippines to use helicopters to evacuate their wounded.

Two of the regiment's late replacements authored books after the war ended. Norman Mailer wrote The Naked and the Dead, and Francis Gwaltney authored The Day the Century Ended, later filmed as Between Heaven and Hell.

Postwar
The regiment was inactivated in Japan in 1946 but was re-organized on 13 November 1947 as the 112th Mechanized Cavalry Reconnaissance Squadron, then reorganized on 12 September 1949 as the 112th Armored Cavalry Regiment. On 16 March 1957 the regiment became the 112th Armor and was transferred to active service.  In 1961 it was transferred back to the National Guard as part of the 49th Armored Division. Following the reflagging of the 49th Armored Division, the 112th Armor became part of the 56th Brigade of the 36th Infantry Division.

From 1973 all of the Texas Army National Guard armor units were renumbered as battalions of the 112th Armor.  From 1988 to 1993 eight battalions were assigned to the 112th making it then the largest armored regiment in the U.S. Army.

21st Century

On 17 October 2008, the 4th Battalion, 112th Armor was renamed 1st Squadron, 112th Cavalry. The unit carries the colors and lineage of the original 112th Cavalry Regiment. The squadron Headquarters and Headquarters Troop is based in Bryan, Texas, with A Troop, B Troop, and C Troop based in Taylor, Rosenberg, and Houston, respectively. A and B Troops are equipped as cavalry units with HMMWVs, and C Troop is a dismounted infantry unit.

The 1st Squadron, 112th Cavalry is part of the 72nd Infantry Brigade Combat Team of the 36th Infantry Division.

In early 2015, 1-112 Cavalry deployed to the Sinai Peninsula in Egypt as multinational force and observers (MFO), tasked with ensuring peace between Israel and Egypt in accordance with the 1979 treaty between the two nations. The squadron completed its tour in November 2015 and redeployed to the United States.

In 2020, 1-112 Cavalry again deployed to the Sinai Peninsula. 1-112 Cavalry officially assumed MFO duties in the Sinai on 8 March 2020, relieving 1st Battalion, 294th Infantry Regiment of the Guam Army National Guard. On 24 November 2020, 1-112 Cavalry was relieved by 1st Battalion, 133rd Field Artillery Regiment, also of the Texas Army National Guard.

References

External links
Texas military forces museum 
Oral history project

Military units and formations established in 1918
112